Cambarus subterraneus, the Delaware County cave crayfish, is a species of crayfish in the family Cambaridae. It has been found only in three caves in Delaware County, Oklahoma.

The IUCN conservation status of Cambarus subterraneus is "CR", critically endangered. The species faces an extremely high risk of extinction in the immediate future. The IUCN status was reviewed in 2010.

References

Further reading

 
 
 

Cambaridae
Articles created by Qbugbot
Crustaceans described in 1993
Cave crayfish
Endemic fauna of Oklahoma